Jade Buddha Palace (sometimes also translated as Jade Buddha Garden or Jade Buddha Temple) is a temple complex housing one of the largest jade Buddha statues in the world. It is situated beside Dongshan Scenic Reserve.

The front of the stone has been carved with an image of Sakyamuni (a.k.a. Gautama) Buddha. On the back of the stone Guanyin (a.k.a. Avalokitesvara) Buddha has been carved. The jade stone was found on 22 July 1960 in Xiuyan County of Anshan which is known as the "hometown of jade" (Xiuyan jade is not really jade, but Serpentinite). It was declared a treasure of the State and listed as a protected property by Chinese Premier Zhou Enlai. Anshan city government commissioned the carving which took a team of 120 sculptors 18 months to complete. The temple complex was opened on 3 September 1996. It claims to be one the tallest buildings of ancient Chinese architectural style in China.

References 

Anshan
Chinese sculpture
Individual hardstone carvings
Colossal Buddha statues
Rock art in China
Buildings and structures in Liaoning
Tourist attractions in Liaoning